New Africa Analysis is an African news and current affairs publication based in the U.K., and distributed in the UK and South Africa. The publication consists of a fortnightly magazine and a website.

Editorial position 
The publication claims to report on news relating to Africa in a progressive manner.

List of editors and contributors 
The current editor is Charles Davies, a British/Sierra Leonean journalist, former Editor of the Christian Monitor newspaper.

The editorial board includes Peter Penfold, former British High Commissioner to Sierra Leone, Val Collier, former head of Sierra Leone's Anti Corruption Commission  and Keith Somerville, lecturer in journalism at University of Kent, formerly at Brunel University. Notable contributors have included South African novelist and critic Brent Meersman.

References

External links 
 

News magazines published in the United Kingdom
Biweekly magazines published in the United Kingdom
Magazines established in 2008
Africa-focused media